Manuel Lima FRSA (born May 3, 1978) is a Portuguese–American designer, author, and lecturer known for his work in information visualization and visual culture. WIRED describes Lima as "the man who turns data into art" and Forbes magazine says "Manuel has helped elevate information visualization to an art form." He is the author of three books translated into several languages and currently resides in New York City with his wife and two daughters.

Biography 
Lima grew up in São Miguel Island, in the Azores. From an early age Lima has shown an interest in the visual language of maps, many of which were kept in a cabinet at home from various family road trips. His dad has also been an important catalyst in his appreciation for design.

In 1996, at the age of eighteen, he moved to Lisbon to pursue a BFA degree in Industrial Design from the Faculty of Architecture at Technical University of Lisbon. After an internship in Copenhagen, Denmark, at the design studio Kontrapunkt, Lima went on to study at Parsons School of Design in New York City, where he received a MFA in Design and Technology in 2005. Lima recalls a lecture from his Parsons teacher Christopher Kirwan, back in 2004, as the moment that drove him towards information design. His thesis "Blogviz: Mapping the dynamics of Information Diffusion in Blogspace" was subsequently published by Omniscriptum Publishing in 2009. During his MFA program Lima worked for Siemens Corporate Research Center, the American Museum of Moving Image and Parsons Institute for Information Mapping (PIIM).

It was during his time at PIIM, that Lima consolidated his research in information visualization and complex networks leading to the creation in October 2005 of VisualComplexity.com, an online archive for network visualization. Following his MFA, Lima worked as a designer and manager for advertising agency R/GA, mobile phone maker Nokia, Microsoft Bing and Codecademy. He currently works for Google as a Design Lead and Startup Mentor.

Work

Networkism 
In his first book Visual Complexity: Mapping Patterns of Information (2011), Lima covers the growing popularity of the network construct, not just as a scientific pursuit but as a cultural meme. In chapter six Complex Beauty, Lima introduces a new movement or "artistic trend" characterized by the depiction of metaphorical graph structures, which he labels "Networkism". As Lima explains:

Sharon Molloy, Emma McNally, Janice Caswell, Tomás Saraceno, and Chiharu Shiota are amongst the artists presented by Lima as precursors of this movement.

Proclivity for circles 

In the Introduction of The Book of Circles: Visualizing Spheres of Knowledge (2017), Lima provides an evolutionary explanation for our propensity towards circular shapes. His account comprises three hypotheses:

1. Humans prefer curves 

Lima mentions that from an early age babies show an innate preference for curves, a human tendency corroborated by different studies, including a seminal paper published in 2006 by cognitive psychologists Moshe Bar and Maital Neta, which revealed a strong human preference for curved objects and typefaces, as well as a 2013 study by researchers at the University of Toronto at Scarborough, which found a similar inclination in architectural spaces.

2. Circles equal happiness 

In his second evolutionary explanation, Lima mentions the experiment conducted by psychologist John N. Bassili in 1978, where the faces of participants were painted black and subsequently covered in dozens of luminescent dots. Participants were then asked to express different emotions in order to better understand the visual contour of each sentiment. As Lima describes:

3. Spherical geometry of the eye  

In his third point, Lima hypothesizes on how the circular framing and spherical geometry of our visual field, which cause a distortion similar to a "fish-eye lens" or a "crystal ball", could further "reinforce our innate tendency toward all things circular". "Perhaps the brain prefers forms and contours that have a better fit within such a conditioned field of view." says Lima.

Recognition 
Lima was nominated by Creativity magazine as "one of the 50 most creative and influential minds of 2009" and was elected Fellow of the Royal Society of Arts (FRSA) in 2010. Lima was selected for the Innovative Entrepreneurship Award in the Portuguese Diaspora (Prémio Empreendedorismo Inovador na Diáspora Portuguesa) by the Portuguese President and was elected the curator for the Portuguese delegation at the London Design Biennale 2016.

Publications 
 Lima, Manuel. The Book of Circles: Visualizing Spheres of Knowledge; Princeton Architectural Press, 2017. 
 Lima, Manuel. The Book of Trees: Visualizing Branches of Knowledge; Princeton Architectural Press, 2014. 
 Lima, Manuel. Visual Complexity: Mapping Patterns of Information; Princeton Architectural Press, 2011. 
 Lima, Manuel. Blogviz: Mapping the dynamics of Information Diffusion in Blogspace; Omniscriptum Publishing, 2009.

References

External links 
Manuel Lima's Official Web Site.
Manuel Lima's List of Talks.
VisualComplexity.com.
American Scientist Interview | First Person: Manuel Lima
Interview with Manuel Lima for Design Observer
Interview with Manuel Lima for MAS Context

1978 births
Living people
Information visualization experts
Design writers
Parsons School of Design alumni
Technical University of Lisbon alumni
Portuguese designers
American people of Portuguese descent